HM Magazine is a monthly, digital and print on demand publication focusing on hard music and alternative culture of interest to Christians. It is headquartered in Houston, Texas. The magazine states that its goal is to "honestly and accurately cover the current state of hard music and alternative culture from a faith-based perspective."

History 

In 1985, Doug Van Pelt started Heaven's Metal as a fanzine. It was Van Pelt's friend who would later place a classified ad in the 100th issue of Kerrang!, a British magazine focused on covering rock musicians and bands. During that time, Christian Metal as a genre began to gain more attention, with Heaven's Metal profiting from this as the only publication exclusively covering that genre. Soon, Heaven's Metal achieved more popularity and became an official publication, with five full-time journalists working for the magazine. Around this time, Heaven's Metal achieved a regular subscription base of 15,000 readers.

During the 1990s, HM sealed a distribution deal with a major magazine wholesaler that immediately increased its print-run from 13,000 to 22,000 copies, and it allowed Van Pelt and his co-workers to double ad rates, making HM a stable business enterprise. Later, it would be two specific articles that would cement HM'''s mainstream popularity: the first was the band King's X's vocalist Doug Pinnick using an interview with HM'' to talk about his sexuality, and the second being Alice Cooper's interview in 2002 about his spiritual beliefs.

In February 2013, Van Pelt sold the magazine to current editor David Stagg under undisclosed terms.

References

Further reading 

Austin Chronicle: HM Editor/Publisher Doug Van Pelt's Hard-Rocking Christian Empire  August 7, 2000
 Phantom Tollbooth: Heaven's Metal Re-launches As A Fanzine October 4, 2004

External links 
 

1985 establishments in Texas
2011 disestablishments in Texas
Christian magazines
Christian metal
Defunct magazines published in the United States
Magazines established in 1985
Magazines disestablished in 2011
Magazines published in Texas
Mass media in Houston
Monthly magazines published in the United States
Online music magazines published in the United States
Online magazines with defunct print editions